Jean-Baptiste Mac Nemara, baron du Mung, seigneur de la Rochecourbon, Tourfou, Moullet et autres lieux (circa 1690 — Rochefort, 18 October 1756) was a French Navy officer of Irish origin.

Biography

Origins 
Mac Nemara was born to Catherine Saint-Jean (d. 1774) and to Jean Mac Nemara (d. 1732), an Irish nobleman and   jacobite refugee who had fled to Lorient. His brother, Claude Matthieu Mac Nemara, had a career in the French Navy, rising to captain and to Knight in the Order of Saint-Louis.

In 1713, Jean-Baptiste Mac Nemara married Julienne Stapleton in the chapel of  château des Dervallières in Nantes. Stapleton was an heir to Jean Ier Stapleton, an Irish of Nantes, who had an plantation in Saint-Domingue.

After Stapleton died in 1748, Mac Nemara married Marie-Catherine Larcher on 25 August 1754 at Mung . Larcher was the widow of André Martin de Poinsable, former Governor of Martinique. Her granddaughter Julie Catherine de Turpin de Jouhé would later marry Nicolas Henri de Grimouard on 1 December 1779 in Rochefort.

Naval career 
A protégé of Duke de Bourbon, Mac Nemara joined the Navy as a garde-marine on 5 April 1707. In 1710 he served on Atalante under Du Clerc in an expedition against Rio de Janeiro. Wounded and taken prisoner on 19 September 1710, he was freed after two years and promoted to Frigate Lieutenant on 25 November 1713. In 1713, when he married, Mac Nemara served as an Ensign in a company of the Navy and was Commissary for food  at Rochefort arsenal.

Mac Nemara was promoted to enseigne de port on 16 October 1721. He took part in several campaigns in the Caribbean in 1727–1728, 1730–1731, 1739–1740, 1741-1742 and 1744, earning a promotion to aide-major in November 1723 and Lieutenant in 1734.

Head of the Gardes-marines in Rochefort from 1 April 1745, he also led a division in the Caribbean, fighting against FitzRoy Henry Lee and returning to France in 1746. In April 1748, he was promoted to Chef d'escadre, and in 1750 he was appointed to the first Escadre d'évolution. In September 1752, he was promoted to lieutenant général des armées navales, aged 62.

Mac Nemara was the commanding officer of the Navy in Rochefort from 1751 to 1756. In 1756, he headed a 6-ship and 3-frigate squadron to bring reinforcements to Emmanuel Auguste Dubois de La Motte in New France (now Canada), comprising the ships Formidable, Héros, Palmier, Éveillé, Inflexible and Aigle, and the frigates Améthyste, Sirène and Héroïne,  and fought in the action of 8 June 1755. 

On 17 October 1756, Mac Nemara was made a Vice-Admiral and chief of the flotte du Ponant. He died the following day. Hubert de Brienne replaced him.

Sources and references 
 Notes

References

Recent bibliography
 
 
 
 
 
 
 

Older bibliography
 
 
 

Commanders of the Order of Saint Louis
Businesspeople in shipping
French privateers
Jacobites